Balsakha was one of the most popular children magazines in Hindi. In the year 1917, the Indian Press Prayag started publication of Balasakha magazine. This magazine was the most popular of its time. Balsakha was published for more than 53 years and this magazine influenced the child readers and prepared a good number of child writers also.

History and profile
Balsakha was first published in 1917 by Chintamani Ghosh, the founder of Indian Press Prayag (Allahabad).He also published saraswati (magazine). The first editor of Balsakha was Pandit Badrinath Bhatt and later on Thakur Srinath Singh edited the magazine for many years. It was published in Allahabad on a monthly basis. The magazine folded in 1971.

Legacy and content
Balsakha is still remembered in Hindi children's literature. Balsakha was published monthly for more than 50 years. Many distinct and famous personalities of that era had contributed their work towards children literature in Balsakha. Balsakha was also subscribed by library of various states and juvenile jail of then British India. For publishing the life character of various national leaders, the Punjab Text Book Committee of pre-independent India stopped subscribing Balsakha. Publisher and editors of Balsakha and other contemporary magazines assumed children as an independent unit and carried on their work towards children literature. The literary work of these editors was focused on childhood. That is why Balsakha remained popular with children for a long time.

References

External links

1917 establishments in India
1971 disestablishments in India
Defunct magazines published in India
Hindi-language magazines
Children's magazines published in India
Monthly magazines published in India
Magazines established in 1917
Magazines disestablished in 1971
Mass media in Allahabad